Shahrak-e Mohammad Ebn-e Jafar (also Romanized as Shahrak-e Moḩammad Ebn-e Ja‘far; also known as Shahrak-e Dez) is a village in Qeblehi Rural District, in the Central District of Dezful County, Khuzestan Province, Iran. At the 2006 census, its population was 4,148, in 912 families.

References 

Populated places in Dezful County